This is a timeline documenting events of jazz in 1929.

Jazz musicians born that year included Chet Baker and Joe Pass.

Events

Standards

 In 1929 the standards "Ain't Misbehavin'", "Black and Blue" and "Honeysuckle Rose" were published.

Deaths

 March
 15 – Pinetop Smith, American pianist (born 1904).

 June
 2 – Don Murray, American clarinet and saxophone player (born 1904).

 August
 19 – Chris Kelly, American trumpeter (born 1890).

 December
 19 – Blind Lemon Jefferson, American singer, songwriter, and musician (born 1893).

Births

 January
 1 – Arthur Prysock, American singer (died 1997).
 4 – Al Dreares, American drummer (died 2011).
 12 – Rich Matteson, American euphoniumist (died 1993).
 13 – Joe Pass, American guitarist (died 1994).
 16 – G. T. Hogan, American drummer (died 2004).
 20 – Jimmy Cobb, American drummer (died 2020).
 23 – Harold Ousley, American tenor saxophonist and flautist (died 2015).
 25 – Benny Golson, American saxophonist.
 28 – Acker Bilk, English clarinettist and vocalist (died 2014).
 29 – Ed Shaughnessy, American drummer (died 2013).

 February
 7 – Dave Shepherd, English clarinettist (died 2016).
 13 – Frankie Sakai, Japanese comedian, actor, and musician (died 1996).
 25
 Sandy Brown, Scottish clarinettist (died 1975).
 Tommy Newsom, American saxophonist (died 2007).
 27 – Betty Loo Taylor, Hawaii-American pianist (died 2016).

 March
 1 – Eddie Jones, American upright bassist (died 1997).
 3 – Dupree Bolton, American trumpeter (died 1993).
 17 – Simon Flem Devold, Norwegian clarinetist and columnist (died 2015).
 19 – Gene Taylor, American dupright bassist (died 2001).
 20 – Sonny Russo, American trombonist (died 2013).
 22 – Fred Anderson, American tenor saxophonist (died 2010).
 25 – Cecil Taylor, American pianist and poet (died 2018).
 26 – Maurice Simon, American saxophonist (died 2019).
 30 – Valdo Williams, Canadian pianist (died 2010).

 April
 4 –Buster Cooper, American trombonist (died 2016).
 6
 Art Taylor, American drummer (died 1995).
 Edmund Percey, English architect and pianist (died 2014).
 Guylaine Guy, Canadian singer and painter.
 8 – Eiji Kitamura, Japanese clarinetist.
 17 – James Last, German bassist, composer, and big band leader (died 2015).
 18 – Walt Levinsky, American clarinetist (died 1999).
 29 – Ray Barretto, American percussionist (died 2006).

 May
 10 – Mel Lewis, American drummer (died 1990).
 16 – Betty Carter, American singer and bandleader (died 1998).
 17 – Karl Drewo, Austrian saxophonist (died 1995).
 21 – Larance Marable, American drummer (died 2012).
 23 – Julian Euell, American bassist (died 2019).
 29 – Sandy Mosse, American saxophonist (died 1983).

 June
 1 – Lennie Niehaus, American alto saxophonist, arranger, and composer (died 2020).
 2 – Gildo Mahones, American pianist (died 2018).
 8 – Kenny Clare, English drummer (died 1985).
 14 – Cy Coleman, American composer and songwriter (died 2004).

 July
 9 – Alex Welsh, Scottish singer, cornetist, and trumpeter (died 1982).
 13 – Pedro Iturralde, Spanish saxophonist, saxophone teacher and composer (died 2020).
 14 – Alan Dawson, American drummer (died 1996).
 17 – Joe Morello, American drummer (died 2011).
 23 – Danny Barcelona, Filipino-American drummer (died 2007).
 26 – Charlie Persip, American drummer (died 2020).

 August
 2 – Roy Crimmins, English trombonist and composer (died 2014).
 5 – John Armatage, English drummer and arranger.
 6 – Mike Elliott, Jamaican saxophonist.
 14 – Lorez Alexandria, American singer (died 2001).
 16 – Bill Evans, American pianist (died 1980).
 23 – Pete King, British saxophonist (died 2009).
 29 – Algia Mae Hinton, American guitarist and singer (died 2018).

 September
 6 – Charles Moffett, American drummer (died 1997).
 7 – Harry South, English pianist, composer, and arranger (died 1990).
 10 – Prince Lasha, American saxophonist, flautist, and clarinetist (died 2008).
 17 – Sil Austin, American saxophonist (died 2001).
 18 – Teddi King, American singer (died 1977).
 19 – Mel Stewart, American saxophonist and actor (died 2002).
 20 – Joe Temperley, Scottish saxophonist (died 2016).
 24 – John Carter, American clarinetist and saxophonist (died 1991).
 27 – Calvin Jones, American trombonist, bassist, and composer (died 2004).
 29 – Rolf Kühn, German clarinetist and saxophonist.

 October
 2 – Howard Roberts, American guitarist (died 1992).
 10
 Ayten Alpman, Turkish singer (died 2012).
 Ed Blackwell, American drummer (died 1992).
 11
 Curtis Amy, American tenor saxophonist (died 2002).
 Ludek Hulan, Czech upright bassist (died 1979).
 19 – Jack Noren, American drummer (died 1990).
 22 – Giorgio Gaslini, Italian pianist, composer, and conductor (died 2014).
 27 – Elmon Wright, American trumpeter (died 1984).

 November
 1 – Gabe Baltazar, Asian-American alto saxophonist and woodwind doubler.
 25 – Rusty Bryant, American saxophonist (died 1991).
 29 – Francy Boland, Belgian composer and pianist (died 2005).

 December
 12 – Toshiko Akiyoshi, Japanese composer, bandleader, and pianist.
 15 – Barry Harris, American pianist and bandleader.
 18 – Nick Stabulas, American drummer (died 1973).
 19 – Bob Brookmeyer, American trombonist, pianist, arranger, and bandleader (died 2011).
 22 – Red Balaban, American tubist and sousaphonist (died 2013).
 23 – Chet Baker, American trumpeter and singer (died 1988).
 24 – Noel DaCosta, Nigerian-Jamaican composer and violinist (died 2002).
 29
 Matt Murphy, American guitarist, The Blues Brothers (died 2018).
 Susie Garrett, African-American singer and actress (died 2002).

 Unknown date
 Jacques Denjean, French composer and arranger, Les Double Six (died 1995).
 Yusuf Salim, American pianist and composer (died 2008).

References

Bibliography

External links
 History Of Jazz Timeline: 1929 at All About Jazz

Jazz, 1929 In
Jazz by year